The 1950 Wayne Tartars football team represented Wayne University (later renamed Wayne State University) as an independent during the 1950 college football season. Under second-year head coach Louis F. Zarza, the team compiled a 2–7 record.

Schedule

References

Wayne
Wayne State Warriors football seasons
Wayne Tartars football